In crystallography, the Sayre equation, named after David Sayre who introduced it in 1952, is a mathematical relationship that allows one to calculate probable values for the phases of some diffracted beams. It is used when employing direct methods to solve a structure. Its formulation is the following:

Since weak diffracted beams will contribute a little to the sum, this method can be a powerful way of finding the phase of related beams, if some of the initial phases are already known by other methods.

where the  indicates the sign of the structure factor (positive if the phase is 0 and negative if it is ) and the  sign indicates that there is a certain degree of probability that the relationship is true, which becomes higher the stronger the beams are.

References 

Crystallography